Huang Haibo (born 25 November 1976) is a Chinese actor of Manchu descent, best known in film for playing Yu Xiaobei in The Dream of A Young Soldier (2001), and has received critical acclaim for his television work, particularly as Jiang Dongzhi in Chasing, Yu Wei in A Beautiful Daughter-in-law Era, Li Da Benshi in Forever Designation and Guo Ran in Let's get married!.

Early life and education
Huang was born into a military family in Jizhou District of Tianjin, on November 25, 1975. In 1997 he was accepted to Beijing Film Academy, where he majored in acting.

Acting career

Huang's first film role was uncredited appearance in the film Young Prisoners of War (1989). In the following year, he appeared in The Meridian of War, directed by Feng Xiaoning.

In 1992, Huang made his television debut in the historical television series Beiyang Fleet, portraying young Lin Taizeng. The series starring Chen Baoguo, Chen Daoming, Ge You and directed by Feng Xiaoning.

During his junior year, he got a small role in The Years of Intense Emotion (2001), a romance television drama starring Sun Haiying and Lü Liping.

Huang's breakthrough role came when he played Yu Xiaobei in the 2001 film The Dream of A Young Soldier, which garnered him a Best Newcomer Award at the 9th Beijing College Student Film Festival, an Outstanding New Actor Award at the 8th Huabiao Awards and a Golden Phoenix Award.

In 2003, he had a cameo appearance in Let Us Remember, a film starring He Bing, Guo Donglin, Xu Fan, Huang Hong, Cai Ming, Li Mingqi, and Li Xiaolu. That same year, he also participated in Stormy Sea, opposite Wu Gang, Ning Jing, Li Youbin, and Zhao Youliang.

Huang portrayed Deng Shaosheng, Deng Xiaoping's uncle, in My Early Days in France (2004). At the same year, he played the character Zhu Bajie in the shenmo television series Good Luck Zhu Bajie.

In 2005, he played a key supporting role in the historical television series Crying without Tears, starring Vincent Chiao and Park Si-yeon.

From 2006 to 2008, he appeared in dozens of television series, such as Life Hand In Hand (2006), The Love Story in Tangshan (2006), Shanghai Bund (2007), Chasing (2007), Stone Scissors Cloth (2008), and Life Is Beautiful (2008). For his role as Jiang Dongzhi in Chasing, he won the Magnolia Award for Best Actor in a Television Series at the 14th Shanghai Television Festival. He starred with Tony Leung Ka-fai, Emme Wong and Li Tete in the 2008 drama A Chinese Fairy Tale.

Huang co-starred with Du Zhiguo, Ye Jing, He Saifei and Bobo Gan in the 2009 action television series Jianghu Brothers.

Huang became widely known to audiences with A Beautiful Daughter-in-law Era (2010), in which he played the romantic interest of Mao Doudou, Hai Qing's character. He was nominated for Best Actor Award at the 25th Golden Eagle Awards. That same year, he was cast in Welcome to Shama Town, opposite Sun Honglei, Lin Chi-ling, Li Liqun and Vivian Gan.

In 2011, Huang earned his second Best Actor Award at the 18th Shanghai Television Festival for his performance in Forever Designation. He played a supporting role in The Flowers of War, starring Christian Bale, Ni Ni, Zhang Xinyi, Tong Dawei, Atsuro Watabe and Shigeo Kobayashi and directed by Zhang Yimou.

Huang rose to fame after portraying the romantic interest of Gao Yuanyuan's character in the television series Let's get married! (2013), the series was one of the most watched ones in CCTV while it was aired in mainland China in that year.

In 2014, Huang's performance in Uncle Victory which garnered him a Best Actor Award at the Golden Koala Chinese Film Festival in Australia. He starred as Jiang Hai, reuniting him with co-star Zhang Jingchu, who played his love interest, in television series A Selfless Love.

Alleged prostitution event
On May 16, 2014, Beijing Municipal Public Security Bureau announced that Huang was arrested on suspicion of hiring prostitutes, and then he was sentenced to 6 months.

Personal life
In 2014 Huang married actress Qu Shanshan in Los Angeles, California, United States, their son was born on August 6, 2015 in Beijing.

Filmography

Film

Television

Drama

Singles

Film and TV Awards

References

External links

 
Huang Haibo on Chinesemovie

1975 births
Male actors from Tianjin
Living people
Beijing Film Academy alumni
Chinese male film actors
Chinese male television actors
21st-century Chinese male actors
Manchu male actors